John Joseph McLaughlin (March 29, 1927 – August 16, 2016) was an American television personality and political commentator. He created, produced, and hosted the political commentary series The McLaughlin Group. He also hosted and produced John McLaughlin's One on One, which ran from 1984 to 2013.

Education and early career
John Joseph McLaughlin was born in Providence, Rhode Island, the son of Augustus Hugh McLaughlin and his wife Eva Philomena, née Turcotte. He grew up in a Catholic family who were second-generation Irish Americans and attended La Salle Academy (Rhode Island), Providence. At age 18, he entered Weston College in Weston, Massachusetts, which later became the theological seminary of Boston College, to become a Catholic priest.

He entered the Jesuit order in 1947, aged 20, and was ordained as a priest in 1959, and went on to earn two master's degrees (philosophy and English literature) from Boston College. After his ordination, McLaughlin spent some years as a high school teacher at Fairfield College Preparatory School, a Jesuit prep school in Connecticut. He took time off from teaching to earn a Ph.D. (philosophy) from Columbia University. He wrote his thesis on the Catholic poet Gerard Manley Hopkins. He then became a writer and later assistant editor for the Jesuit current affairs publication, America, in New York City. Disagreements with the editor of the magazine led to his departure in 1970 after which he moved back to Providence.

Political career

McLaughlin was originally a supporter of the Democratic Party and opposed the Vietnam War, but then became a war supporter and changed his party affiliation to Republican. In 1970, he sought permission from the Jesuit order to run for a seat in the United States Senate, representing Rhode Island. They had given permission to fellow Jesuit Father Robert Drinan who ran successfully for the United States House of Representatives in Massachusetts. When they refused, McLaughlin ran anyway but lost to the incumbent four-term Senator John O. Pastore. Through a friendship with Pat Buchanan, McLaughlin then became a speechwriter for U.S. President Richard Nixon. In 1974, after the resignation of President Nixon, he spent two months under President Gerald Ford's administration. In 1975, he left the priesthood.

Media career
After leaving the White House, McLaughlin worked with his wife Ann in public relations and in 1980 became a weekend radio host on WRC-AM in Washington, D.C. Eventually he was fired from that job.

He then went on to write for National Review and to host The McLaughlin Group, which premiered in 1982. The television show brought together four political commentators, usually two conservatives and two liberals, with McLaughlin seated in the middle. McLaughlin was known for his loud and forceful style of presentation, usually stating his opinion in an apodictic manner and often cutting off other panelists by declaring their opinion "Wrong!" or putting a question to the panel, listening to other opinions, before finally giving his opinion as "the correct answer". Discussions in the McLaughlin Group tended to run until the very last few seconds of airtime, when McLaughlin would rather abruptly end each episode by saying "Bye-bye!". McLaughlin's style and mannerisms were parodied by comedians and other commentators, most notably Dana Carvey of Saturday Night Live. McLaughlin enjoyed SNL'''s recurring McLaughlin Group sketches, even making a 1991 cameo appearance as the Grim Reaper in one of them.

McLaughlin also hosted the interview show John McLaughlin's One on One, first telecast in 1984, and ended in 2013. Also from 1989 through 1994, he produced and hosted McLaughlin, a one-hour nightly talk show on CNBC. For a short while in 1999, he hosted an MSNBC show, McLaughlin Special Report. The show was announced on January 22, and its cancellation was announced on February 25. A revival of The McLaughlin Group debuted in 2018, and retains McLaughlin's name in the show's title despite his death.

Personal life and death
On August 23, 1975, McLaughlin married Ann Dore (née Lauenstein), his former campaign manager. She served as Secretary of Labor under President Ronald Reagan from 1987 until 1989. During this period, McLaughlin was sued for sexual harassment and discrimination by a former employee. He settled the suit in December 1989.

McLaughlin and Dore divorced in 1992. McLaughlin married his second wife Cristina Clara Vidal on June 22, 1997. The marriage ended in divorce in 2010.

During the December 26, 2014, year-end awards episode, McLaughlin ended the show saying: "Person of the year: Pope Francis, especially now that he's told that animals can go to heaven. And Oliver is up there waiting for me." Oliver Productions, Inc., is named after McLaughlin's pet dog  — a Basset Hound — and is seen in an animation as part of the brand logo shown at the close of each show. Oliver shared their Watergate apartment during McLaughlin's tenure as speechwriter for President Nixon.

After missing his first broadcast in 34 years, McLaughlin died on August 16, 2016, at his home in Washington, D.C. of prostate cancer at the age of 89. McLaughlin's last message to fans was August 13, when he explained he had missed recent tapings due to his poor health.

In popular culture
The McLaughlin Group was parodied a number of times on Saturday Night Live in the early 1990s, where McLaughlin was played by Dana Carvey. McLaughlin also appeared in several films, including Dave, Mission: Impossible, Independence Day, and War, Inc., generally portraying himself discussing a political character in the movie. In the 2009 movie Watchmen, he is portrayed by Gary Houston in an early scene interviewing Pat Buchanan (played by James M. Connor) and Eleanor Clift (played by Mary Ann Burger) about the possibility of nuclear war with the Soviet Union. McLaughlin also hosted a special celebration for the 200th episode of the NBC sitcom Cheers''.

References

Further reading

External links

The McLaughlin Group website: John McLaughlin biography.

1927 births
2016 deaths
21st-century Roman Catholics
20th-century American Jesuits
21st-century American Jesuits
20th-century American journalists
21st-century American journalists
American male journalists
American television news anchors
American people of Irish descent
American political commentators
American Roman Catholic priests
American speechwriters
American television talk show hosts
Boston College alumni
CNBC people
Columbia Graduate School of Arts and Sciences alumni
Deaths from cancer in Washington, D.C.
Deaths from prostate cancer
Former Jesuits
Journalists from Rhode Island
Journalists from Washington, D.C.
Laicized Roman Catholic priests
La Salle Academy alumni
National Review people
Nixon administration personnel
Rhode Island Democrats
Rhode Island Republicans
Writers from Providence, Rhode Island
Washington, D.C., Republicans
PBS people